Oceanside is a hamlet and census-designated place (CDP) located in the southern part of the town of Hempstead, Nassau County, New York, United States. The population was 32,109 at the 2010 census.

History 
Originally known as South Bay, the English government established a township there in 1674 called Christian Hook, basing the name on the predominant religious affiliation of colonists in the area. Land development proceeded rapidly, and oyster sales took their place as a dominant force, with the local business "Mott's Landing" becoming a favorite place to buy oysters.

In the nineteenth century, the town residents decided that "Oceanville" sounded better than "Christian Hook": it was "Oceanville Oysters" that sold, and in 1864, the new name became official.  However, there was already an Oceanville in New York, so "Ocean Side", as two words, was adopted as the town's name in 1890 (this despite it not actually fronting the Atlantic Ocean, which is located a few miles to the south. It is separated from the ocean by Reynolds Channel and other marsh islands, as well as the Long Beach Barrier Island).

The Oceanside Fire Department  was established in 1902. Columbia Engine Co. #1, an old firehouse, still exists, and is located at the southwest corner of the triangle where Lincoln Avenue meets Long Beach Road.

In the 1900s, the town began rapidly expanding south, building over swamps and marshes and dramatically increasing the size of the town from a small port to a large hamlet.  In 1918, the name was condensed to "Oceanside".

Nathan's Famous opened its second restaurant on June 4, 1959, on Long Beach Road in Oceanside, taking over the site of the once-popular Roadside Rest, which had opened several decades before and had offered live entertainment and dancing on a large dance floor as well as Nathan's-type frankfurters and locally caught seafood.  There was a large Nathan's building with play areas and a big open dining room that had a stage.  Shows were family events.  The building was razed in 1976, and a strip mall was built in its place.  A modern Nathan's franchise subsequently opened on a small section of the original property, at the  corner of Long Beach Road and Windsor Parkway. In 2016, Nathan's moved to a smaller location on Long Beach Road.

Oceanside, New York, was a part of the post-World War II housing boom, with even more land being built over with houses and as a result, the town began to resemble Levittown. More schools were built as well as massive houses and a public park on the swampland. Because of this, Oceanside became more vulnerable to floods and natural disasters. This was proven in 2012, when Oceanside saw its worst natural disaster when Hurricane Sandy hit the area. The storm completely flooded the southern portion of the town with areas as far north as Nathan's reporting waves of water rushing down streets. Sandy also knocked out power for nearly two weeks after a substation in the nearby town of Island Park exploded. Oceanside was one of the many towns upset with the slow response from the Long Island Power Authority and held a rally because of it. As of 2019, Oceanside still has many who are dealing with the consequences of Sandy, and some have begun leaving, with the value of houses remaining high. Flooding in low-lying areas would be much more common.

In 2014, after years of speculation and lack of business, Nathan's announced it was moving to a smaller location on the corner of Long Beach Road and Merle Avenue (near the former Chwatsky's). This move was greeted with  controversy as many feared that the traffic from deliveries would interfere with the traffic headed to the school during weekdays. Eventually, the Town of Hempstead approved this move and The original building was officially closed on January 4, 2015. The third Nathan's opened in early 2015, and was built as a throwback to both the first and second locations as well as having a contemporary feel to the interior.
In 2016, a massive blizzard slammed into the island and dumped nearly 2 feet of snow, and flooded many of the towns around it and some portions of the town closest to the channel.

Geography 

Oceanside is located at  (40.636286, -73.637404).

The Town was built over swampland spanning from the early 1900s to the late 1970s. Most of the town before this, was a small sea port near the more established villages of Rockville Centre, Baldwin, and East Rockaway. The area of the town increased exponentially and its population would boom to nearly 30,000 people by the end of the 1990s.

It has a humid subtropical climate (Cfa) and average monthly temperatures in the village centre range from 32.1° F in January to 74.8° F in July. The local hardiness zone is 7b.

Transportation 
Long Beach Road, Oceanside Road, Lawson Boulevard and, Atlantic Avenue are some of the main roads in Oceanside. Other roads such as Brower Avenue and Waukena Avenue, which were built as residential streets, also carry major traffic. Sunrise Highway is located along the Northern border of the town with Rockville Centre and Baldwin. Merrick Road briefly passes through near South Nassau Communities Hospital

The Long Beach Branch of the Long Island Rail Road passes through the west side of Oceanside, with the Oceanside station being at Weidner Avenue and Lawson Boulevard. The Oceanside train stop is the 3rd train station south on the Long Beach line.  The travel time from the Oceanside train station to Penn Station is approximately 40 minutes.  In the northern part of Oceanside, many commuters use either the nearby Rockville Centre Station or the Baldwin Station on the Babylon Branch.

The Nassau Inter-County Express passes through Oceanside with the n4 and n15 routes. The n36 served Oceanside until 2017, and the n16 also served Oceanside until 2012, but saw its route shortened due to budget cuts. There is presently no bus headed for the Oceanside LIRR nor are there plans for this.

Demographics

2010 Census 
As of the 2010 census the population was 92.2% White, 85.9% Non-Hispanic White 1.7% African American, 0.1% Native American, 2.7% Asian, 0.0% Pacific Islander, 2.4% from other races, and 1.3% from two or more races. Hispanic or Latino of any race were 9.2% of the population.

2000 Census 
As of the census of 2000, there were 32,733 people, 11,224 households, and 9,125 families residing in the area. The population density was 6,523.6 per square mile (2,517.6/km2). There were 11,396 housing units at an average density of 2,271.2/sq mi (876.5/km2). The racial makeup of the CDP was 94.95% White, 0.56% African American, 0.07% Native American, 1.83% Asian, 0.01% Pacific Islander, 1.58% from other races, and 1.00% from two or more races. Hispanic or Latino of any race were 5.90% of the population.

There were 11,224 households, out of which 36.9% had children under the age of 18 living with them, 69.5% were married couples living together, 8.8% had a female householder with no husband present, and 18.7% were non-families. 16.1% of all households were made up of individuals, and 9.1% had someone living alone who was 65 years of age or older. The average household size was 2.90 and the average family size was 3.25.

In the community, the population was spread out, with 25.0% under the age of 18, 6.1% from 18 to 24, 27.6% from 25 to 44, 25.7% from 45 to 64, and 15.6% who were 65 years of age or older. The median age was 40 years. For every 100 females, there were 93.7 males. For every 100 females age 18 and over, there were 89.5 males.

According to a 2007 estimate, the median income for a household in the community was $100,167, and the median income for a family was $109,937. Males had a median income of $55,652 versus $40,163 for females. The per capita income for the CDP was $30,245. About 2.8% of families and 3.5% of the population were below the poverty line, including 3.8% of those under age 18 and 3.9% of those age 65 or over.

Education 
It is a part of the Oceanside School District.

Oceanside's first school was built around 1838 on the northwest corner of Oceanside and Foxhurst Roads. It only had one room and an attic. The structure still stood as of 1960, but was moved and is now a private dwelling. The land where the school once stood is now known as the Schoolhouse Green, where many school events are held.  Oceanside schools have adopted numerical names, 1 through 9.  School #1 was razed in 1981.  Today, Schools #2-5, 8 and 9E are elementary schools, School #6 is a kindergarten center, School #7 is a high school, and #9M serves as the middle school. School #9 bears the name of Walter Boardman.

Presently, Phyllis Harrington is the superintendent of the Oceanside School District. She replaced Dr. Herb Brown, who retired at the end of 2012–2013 school year.

Nearby colleges include Adelphi University, Nassau Community College, Molloy College, Hofstra University, New York Institute of Technology, and C.W. Post College.

Notable people 
 Don Diamont, actor known for his roles as Brad Carlton on The Young and the Restless and Bill Spencer Jr. on The Bold and the Beautiful.

Arthur Rose Eldred (1895–1951), first Eagle Scout (Boy Scouts of America).
Jay Fiedler (born 1971), a former NFL quarterback for the Minnesota Vikings, Jacksonville Jaguars, Tampa Bay Buccaneers, Philadelphia Eagles, Miami Dolphins, and New York Jets.
 Susie Fishbein (born 1968), best-selling Orthodox Jewish kosher cookbook author.
Moshe Gottesman, rabbi and dean for the Hebrew Academy of Nassau County
Gilda Gray, "flapper", 1920s-'30s, known as the "Shimmy Queen" and Florenz Ziegfeld's "golden girl"
Murray Handwerker, businessman
Andrew Herman, former professional soccer player 
Art Heyman (1941–2012), college basketball AP Player of the Year (1963) and professional basketball 
Bob Iger, Former CEO of The Walt Disney Company and current Executive Chairman
Dan Ingram (1934-2018), disc jockey
Leon Johnson, former professional football player
Dennis Leonard, member of the Kansas City Royals Hall of Fame, started Game 5 of the 1976 and 1977 ALCS vs. the New York Yankees, won Game 4 of the 1980 World Series vs. the Philadelphia Phillies
Lori Loughlin, actress on the hit television family-comedy series Full House, played the role of Rebecca Donaldson, 1988–1995
Tomas Masaryk, the "Father of the Czech Nation"; lived in Oceanside for a time during his exile of 1918
Mike Massimino, NASA astronaut
Stephen Robert Morse, Emmy-nominated producer and director
David Paymer, actor (Carpool)
Frank Pellegrino, actor (GoodFellas, Law & Order, The Sopranos)
Darby Penney (1952–2021), writer, activist
Andrew Pollack, school safety activist
Betty Robbins (1924–2005), Cantor
Michael Rosenbaum, actor, singer, and film producer
Jackie Tohn (born c. 1980/1981), actress and musician
Al Trautwig, sportscaster, 2000 NYC Sportscaster of the Year
Ernie Vandeweghe, former Knicks star and father of NBA player and executive Kiki Vandeweghe
Harold E. Varmus, co-recipient of the 1989 Nobel Prize in Physiology or Medicine
Reginald VelJohnson - Actor best known for his role as Carl Winslow on Family Matters

Politics 
All of Oceanside is in New York's 4th congressional district, which is represented by Congressman Anthony D'Esposito. Despite Democratic Victories in the past,  Donald Trump won the Popular vote in Oceanside in the 2016 election.

In popular culture

 Exteriors of the Greater Lincoln Shopping Center were used in the Netflix series Maniac.

References

External links 

Oceanside School District
Our Little Town

Hempstead, New York
Census-designated places in New York (state)
Hamlets in New York (state)
Census-designated places in Nassau County, New York
Hamlets in Nassau County, New York
Populated coastal places in New York (state)